Carrollton Township may refer to the following places in the United States:

 Carrollton Township, Boone County, Arkansas
 Carrollton Township, Carroll County, Arkansas
 Carrollton Township, Greene County, Illinois
 Carrollton Township, Carroll County, Indiana
 Carrollton Township, Michigan

Township name disambiguation pages